Tamera is a location, and valley in northern Tunisia.
 
During the Roman Empire, Tagarbala, was a civitas of the Roman province of Byzacena during late antiquity. The Roman town is identifiable with ruins at Bordj-Tamra.

The town saw British airborne operations in North Africa during World War II.

There is a railway station there.

References

Roman towns and cities in Tunisia
Former populated places in Tunisia
Archaeological sites in Tunisia